Nutrient depletion is a form of resource depletion and refers to the loss of nutrients and micronutrients in a habitat or parts of the biosphere, most often the soil (soil depletion, soil degradation). On the level of a complete ecological niche or ecosystem, nutrient depletion can also come about via the loss of the nutrient substrate (soil loss, wetland loss, etc.). Nutrients are usually the first link in the food chain, thus a loss of nutrients in a habitat will affect nutrient cycling and eventually the entire food chain.

Nutrient depletion can refer to shifts in the relative nutrient composition and overall nutrient quantity (i.e. food abundance). Human activity has changed both in the natural environment extensively, usually with negative effects on wildlife flora and fauna.

The opposite effect is known as eutrophication or nutrient pollution. Both depletion and eutrophication lead to shifts in biodiversity and species abundance (usually a decline).
The effects are bidirectional in that a shift in species composition in a habitat may also lead to shift in the nutrient composition.

See also
Soil nutrient
Soil erosion

References

Ecology
Natural resources